The Good Guys and the Bad Guys is a 1969 American comedy Western film directed by Burt Kennedy. It stars Robert Mitchum and George Kennedy.

Plot
Jim Flagg is the marshal in the town of Progress. He hears arch-rival Big John McKay is headed toward town so he warns Mayor Wilker, a typical cheap politician, and others in Progress about rumor of an impending train robbery. Wilker doesn't appreciate Flagg causing a panic and relieves him of his job and badge by retiring him.

Flagg sets out on his own and discovers McKay has joined up with a band of youthful outlaws. After being taken prisoner, Flagg escapes death thanks to McKay's intervention after the youthful Waco takes over the gang, but the two old enemies end up in a fistfight.

Taken back to town, Flagg puts McKay in a boarding house run by Mary, a widow. The mayor and town folks don't take the threat seriously. When the outlaws arrive, intent on robbing a train, McKay sides with Flagg in defeating their plans. Flagg's old friend Grundy plays the fool and gets himself killed by one of the gang members.

The outlaws intend to rob the train before it arrives at the town bank when it stops at the station. Flagg and McKay board the train before it reaches town. Although they are initially detained by on-board security inside a privy, they are able to break free. They climb into the locomotive cab and take the crew hostage. The train does not stop at the station and passes into town.

Mayor Wilker and a band of townspeople chase after the train. The outlaws, upon realizing the train has not stopped, also chase after it. McKay uncouples the front cars of the train from the rear passenger coaches, overtaking the outlaws. The train approaches a section of broken track over a cliff and is too fast to stop in time. Flagg, McKay and the workers bail out before it plunges off the cliff and explodes.

The outlaws catch up and rob the burning train compartments. Flagg and McKay ambush them and kill most of them in the ensuing gunfight. McKay meets Waco as he is about to escape. Waco manages to wound McKay, who then shoots him dead. McKay remarks to Flagg that he "thought he could beat him [Waco]" to which Flagg replies "You did beat him."

Mayor Wilker arrives and expresses his gratitude to the two for saving the town and hence his reputation as a mayor. When interviewed by a press journalist, Wilker is asked whether he would consider running for state governor. He is delighted to consider the prospect. Flagg thinks Wilker really could "become president one day."

The town marshal asks Flagg to take back his badge for his heroic deed, but he turns down the opportunity. He gives one piece of advice to the marshal, that, in order to be successful, "You have to tell the good guys from the bad guys."

The film ends on a humorous note as Flagg arrests McKay and handcuffs him, despite McKay's protests. Referring to an earlier incident in the film, Flagg jokes that he will always keep his word, as he once promised to land McKay in jail.

Cast
Robert Mitchum as Flagg
George Kennedy as McKay
Martin Balsam as Mayor Wilker
David Carradine as Waco
Tina Louise as Carmel
Lois Nettleton as Mary
John Carradine as Ticker
Marie Windsor as Polly
Buddy Hackett as Ed (uncredited)
Douglas Fowley as Grundy
John Davis Chandler as Deuce
Dick Peabody as Boyle
Kathleen Freeman as Mrs. Stone (Mother)
Jimmy Murphy as Buckshot
Garrett Lewis as Hawkins
Nick Dennis as Engineer #2
Dorothy Adams as Mrs. Pierce (uncredited)
Robert Anderson as Jed (uncredited)
Jimmy Booth as Wagon Driver (uncredited)
Nick Borgani as Townsman (uncredited)
Danny Borzage as Accordionist (uncredited)
Paul Bradley as Barfly (uncredited)
Thordis Brandt as Babe (uncredited)
David Cargo as David Cargo - reporter (uncredited)
David S. Cass Sr. as Tuber (uncredited)
Noble "Kid" Chissell as Townsman (uncredited)
George Dunn as Engineer #1 (uncredited)
John Fritz as Townsman (uncredited)
Bobby Gilbert as Boarding house guest (uncredited)
Angela Greene as Judy (uncredited)
Darby Hinton as Pug (uncredited)
Jackie Joseph as Doris (uncredited)
Irene Kelly as Ginny (uncredited)
Kenner G. Kemp as Saloon Dealer (uncredited)
Alan Lee as Townsman (uncredited)
Stuart Lee as Townsman (uncredited)
Paul Lees as Miles (uncredited)

Production
The movie was filmed on location in Chama, New Mexico, and other locations in New Mexico, Thousand Oaks, California, Silverton, Colorado, and the Warner Bros. Burbank Studios, California.

Reception
Many critics failed to comprehend the comedic nature of the film. Howard Thompson of The New York Times said, "Whatever possessed these three actors [Mitchum, Kennedy and Balsam] to amble through such a dinky prairie oyster stumps us. And so does the uncertain tone of the picture, methodically directed by Burt Kennedy, which only toward the end asserts itself, clearly and lamely, as a good-natured spoof." Variety wrote that the film "provides what in today's market is acceptable family fare, laughs overshadowing the serious moments." Roger Ebert gave the film 2.5 stars out of 4, calling it "a fairly good Western but not good enough." Gene Siskel of the Chicago Tribune also gave it 2.5 stars out of 4, calling it "a pleasant enough oater that is low on violence and drama. It won't offend a soul, and is merely made for that catch-all evaluation, 'decent entertainment.'" Charles Champlin of the Los Angeles Times called the film "slow, gross, heavy-handed, neither funny nor sweetly sad." Gary Arnold of The Washington Post wrote, "Burt Kennedy's direction of this hokum is lively and likeable, but I'd prefer an older sort of hokum: Western melodrama with comic interludes or undercurrents, like 'Ride the High Country' and 'True Grit' at its infrequent best and William Wyler's 'The Westerner,' rather than deliberate, gratuitous spoofing."

See also
 List of American films of 1969

References

External links
 
 
 
 

1969 films
Films directed by Burt Kennedy
1969 Western (genre) films
American Western (genre) comedy films
Films scored by William Lava
Warner Bros. films
Films shot in New Mexico
Films shot in Los Angeles County, California
1960s English-language films
1960s American films